To date, at least 25 different genes have been implicated in causing gonadotropin-releasing hormone (GnRH) deficiency conditions such as Kallmann syndrome (KS) or other forms of congenital hypogonadotropic hypogonadism (CHH) through a disruption in the production or activity of GnRH. These genes involved cover all forms of inheritance, and no one gene defect has been shown to be common to all cases, which makes genetic testing and inheritance prediction difficult.

The number of genes known to cause cases of KS/CHH is still increasing. In addition, it is thought that some cases of KS/CHH are caused by two separate gene defects occurring at the same time.


Genes
A table of known genes responsible for cases of GnRH deficiency conditions is shown below. Listed are the estimated prevalence of cases caused by the specific gene, additional associated symptoms and the form of inheritance. Between 35 and 45% of cases of KS/CHH have an unknown genetic cause.

See also
 Kallmann syndrome
 Hypogonadotropic hypogonadism
 GnRH
 Isolated hypogonadotropic hypogonadism

References

Gonadotropin-releasing hormone and gonadotropins
Genetic diseases and disorders